

Werner Kienitz (3 June 1885  – 31 December 1959) was a German general in the Wehrmacht during World War II who commanded the XVII. Corps. He was a recipient of the Knight's Cross of the Iron Cross of Nazi Germany.

Awards

 Knight's Cross of the Iron Cross on 31 August 1941 as General der Infanterie and commander of XVII. Armeekorps

References

Citations

Bibliography

 
 

1885 births
1959 deaths
Military personnel from Hamburg
German Army generals of World War II
Generals of Infantry (Wehrmacht)
German Army personnel of World War I
Recipients of the Knight's Cross of the Iron Cross
German prisoners of war in World War II held by the United Kingdom
Recipients of the clasp to the Iron Cross, 1st class
Major generals of the Reichswehr